Pushpa Kumari Kohli is the first Hindu woman to become a police officer in Pakistan. She was posted as Assistant sub-inspector of police (ASI) in Sindh province after she passed the provincial competitive examination through Sindh Public Service Commission.

Early life
Pushpa Kumari Kohli was born 1990 in Kohli scheduled caste Hindu family. She grew up in a middle-class family in the Samaro town in the Mirpurkhas District of Sindh Province. Her father runs a grocery store and her mother works as a family planning officer in population welfare department.

Education
Pushpa Kumari graduated in from Dow University of Health Sciences in critical care in 2014.

Career
Pushpa worked in the NGO Marie Stopes Society in hometown Samaro. Later she joined the medical field. Till 2018, Pushpa Kumari worked as an intensive care unit (ICU) technologist at the Benazir Bhutto Accident and Emergency Trauma Centre. In 2018, she applied for the vacant Assistant sub-Inspector post in 2018 and wrote the competitive public service commission exam in January 2019, which age qualified and became Assistant sub-inspector of police (ASI).

Personal life
Pushpa Kumari is married to Narain Das, who works as a supervisor for Bahria Town. They are currently living in Karachi. She believes that inspiring from her other girls and women will decide to join daring career choices like police, army, air force or navy.

See also
Krishna Kohli
Mangla Sharma
Veeru Kohli
Suman Kumari

References

Pakistani Hindus
People from Mirpur Khas District
Sindhi people
Pakistani women police officers
Living people
1990 births